Flower Arlene Newhouse (May 10, 1909 – July 8, 1994) was an American Christian mystic and spiritual teacher.

Early life
Newhouse was born Mildred "Mimi" Arlene Sechler in Allentown, Pennsylvania on May 10, 1909.  She claimed she had the gift of clairvoyance from age 6.

Career
In 1924, Newhouse, along with her mother and sister moved to Los Angeles.  Newhouse soon became a guest speaker at a number of churches and lecture halls.

Newhouse's work emphasized the need, as she described it, to consistently live the Christ-inspired life through a mystical union as one with the living Christ, and to directly experience God through living love, and by a steadfast active expression of God's presence from within.

She began traveling regularly to Santa Barbara and San Francisco, and eventually throughout the United States and Canada as an invited speaker.  On one of these lecture engagements, she met her future husband, Lawrence George Newhouse (July 18, 1910 - January 29, 1963), whom she married on October 31, 1933.

In 1940, Newhouse and her husband founded Questhaven Retreat and the Christward Ministry.  Her ministry was a hybrid theology drawing on Christian mysticism.  Her followers describe her teachings as "not doctrine, but a practical guide to the direct, immediate experience of God."

References

External links
 Questhaven website

1909 births
1994 deaths
20th-century Christian mystics
American spiritual teachers
Protestant mystics
Clairvoyants
Women mystics